Alan Cumming  (born 27 January 1965) is a Scottish actor. His London stage work includes Hamlet, the Maniac in Accidental Death of an Anarchist (for which he won an Olivier Award), the lead in Bent, The National Theatre of Scotland's The Bacchae and Samuel Beckett's Endgame at The Old Vic, opposite Daniel Radcliffe. On Broadway, he has appeared in The Threepenny Opera, as the master of ceremonies in Cabaret (for which he won a Tony Award), Design for Living, and a one-man adaptation of Macbeth.

Cumming's early films include GoldenEye (1995) and Emma (1996). He then played Fegan Floop in the Spy Kids trilogy (2001–2003), Nightcrawler in X2 (2003), and Loki in Son of the Mask (2005). On television, Cumming is best known for his role in the CBS series The Good Wife (2010–2016), for which he was nominated for three Primetime Emmy Awards, two Screen Actors Guild Awards, two Golden Globe Awards and a Satellite Award. More recently, Cumming starred in the CBS series Instinct (2018–2019) and the Apple TV+ series Schmigadoon! (2021),

Cumming has written a novel, Tommy's Tale (2002), an autobiography, Not My Father's Son: A Memoir (2014), and a topical memoir, Baggage: Tales from a Fully Packed Life (2019). He had a cable talk show called Eavesdropping with Alan Cumming and produced a line of perfumed products labelled "Cumming". He has also contributed opinion pieces to many publications and performed the cabaret shows I Bought a Blue Car Today and Alan Cumming Sings Sappy Songs. In 2022, he received a Tony Award for Best Musical as a producer of the musical A Strange Loop.

Early life
Cumming was born on 27 January 1965 in Aberfeldy, Perthshire, Scotland. His mother, Mary Darling, was an insurance company secretary and his father, Alex Cumming, was the head forester of Panmure Estate, which is located near Carnoustie, on the east coast of Scotland, and is where Cumming grew up. He has described the environment as "feudal". He has a brother, Tom, who is six years older, and a niece and two nephews. His brother is a property manager in Southampton, England. Cumming attended Monikie Primary School and Carnoustie High School.

In his autobiography Not My Father's Son, Cumming describes the emotional and physical violence his father inflicted on him in his childhood. His mother found it impossible to obtain a divorce until she was financially independent. Cumming said that, after his early 20s, he did not have any communication with his father until just before the filming of his episode of the series Who Do You Think You Are? He then found out his father had believed that Cumming was not his biological son. Later, Cumming and his brother took DNA tests that proved they were indeed his biological children.

Cumming said that his difficult childhood taught him how to act by "needing to suppress my own emotions and feelings around him [his father] when I was a little boy".

Film
Cumming made his film debut in Gillies MacKinnon's short film Passing Glory in 1986. His feature film debut came in 1992 when he starred alongside Sandrine Bonnaire and Bruno Ganz in Ian Sellar's Prague, which premiered at the Cannes Film Festival and earned him the Best Actor award at the Atlantic Film Festival and a Scottish BAFTA Best Actor nomination. American audiences first saw him portraying the smarmy Sean Walsh, an unwanted suitor of Minnie Driver's character, in Circle of Friends, an Irish film released in 1995. Also in 1995 he played Boris Ivanovih Grishenko in the James Bond film GoldenEye. He also played Mr. Elton in Emma in 1996.

His first film in the United States was 1997's Romy and Michele's High School Reunion, playing Sandy Frink opposite Lisa Kudrow and Mira Sorvino. Cumming had a minor role in Stanley Kubrick's final film, Eyes Wide Shut (1996), as a hotel clerk who humorously flirts with Tom Cruise's character; according to Cumming, he was required to go through six auditions for the role. Cumming co-wrote, co-directed, co-produced and co-starred in the ensemble film The Anniversary Party with friend and former Cabaret co-star Jennifer Jason Leigh in 2001.

In 2022, Cumming appeared in My Old School, a documentary about the case of Brandon Lee, a 32-year-old man exposed in 1995 as having attended a Scottish secondary school in the guise of a 17-year-old. Cumming appeared as an avatar for Lee, who did not want to appear on camera for the film, lip syncing to audio of his interviews. Cumming had previously planned to play Lee in a theatrical production in the late 90s which failed to materialize.

Television

United Kingdom
In 1984, Cumming made his television debut in ITV Granada's Travelling Man, before going on to appear later in the 1980s in the Scottish Television series Take the High Road, Taggart and Shadow of the Stone. His breakthrough role was as Bernard Bottle in the Christmas 1991 BBC comedy Bernard and the Genie, a Richard Curtis-scripted film in which he starred alongside Lenny Henry and Rowan Atkinson. He also featured in a comic relief sketch in 1993 on the popular UK television show Blind Date with Atkinson playing Mr. Bean. Cumming went on to star as flight attendant Sebastian Flight in the BBC2 sitcom The High Life in 1995. The series was written by Cumming and co-star Forbes Masson, continuing an acting-writing partnership the two had developed since their drama school days. Also in 1995, Cumming appeared in the series Ghosts.

Cumming returned to British television screens in 2011 to star as Desrae, a crossdresser, on the Sky series The Runaway. He has also made several documentaries: My Brilliant Britain, about Scottish humour, The Real Cabaret in which he investigated the Weimar cabaret artistes, and the BBC's Who Do You Think You Are? in 2010 in which he discovered his maternal grandfather was a war hero who had died playing Russian roulette.

In 2018, he played King James on the eleventh series of Doctor Who.

Starting in 2022, Cumming partnered with British-Australian actress Miriam Margolyes in a television series entitled Miriam and Alan: Lost in Scotland. The series follows the pair as they travel in a motorhome and explore Scotland.

United States

Cumming introduced Masterpiece Mystery! for PBS, beginning in 2008.

He played Eli Gold on the CBS television show The Good Wife. He appeared as a guest star in the latter third of the first season, becoming a series regular in the show's 2010–2011 season.

In 2016, NBC's 1st Look visited Scotland for a special episode, featuring Alan Cumming. It featured areas of the country that are important to Cumming, and showcased Scotland through his eyes. The show was named Best Lifestyle Programme at the Emmys' 60th annual awards ceremony at New York's Marriott Marquis Broadway Ballroom.

Alan Cumming was cast as the lead character in the CBS series Instinct, an academic seeking to help the NYPD solve crimes.

In 2021, he played Mayor Aloysius Menlove, the closeted small-town mayor of Schmigadoon, in the Apple TV+ comedy musical series Schmigadoon!

Theatre
Cumming began his theatre career in his native Scotland, performing in seasons with the Royal Lyceum Edinburgh, Dundee Rep, The Tron Glasgow and tours with Borderline, Theatre Workshop and Glasgow Citizens' TAG. He played Slupianek in the Traverse Theatre, Edinburgh's 1988 production of Conquest of the South Pole, which later transferred to the Royal Court in London and earned him an Olivier Award nomination as Most Promising Newcomer.
He went on to perform plays with the Bristol Old Vic and the Royal Shakespeare Company and played Valere in La Bete at the Lyric, Hammersmith, London. In 1991 he played The Madman in the 1990 Royal National Theatre production of Accidental Death of an Anarchist by Dario Fo, for which he won the Laurence Olivier Award for Best Comedy Performance. He also adapted the play with director Tim Supple. In 1993 he received great critical acclaim and the TMA Best Actor award for playing the title role in the 1993 English Touring Theatre's Hamlet (playing opposite his then-wife, Hilary Lyon, in the role of Ophelia). He played the role of The Master of Ceremonies in Sam Mendes's 1993 revival of the musical Cabaret in London's West End opposite Jane Horrocks as Sally Bowles. He received an Olivier Award nomination for Best Actor in a Musical. He reprised the role in 1998 for the Mendes-Rob Marshall Broadway revival, this time opposite Natasha Richardson as Sally Bowles. He won a Tony Award, Drama Desk Award and Outer Critics Circle Award for his performance.

Other US stage roles include Otto in the 2001 Broadway production of Design for Living by Noël Coward and Mack the Knife in the Bertolt Brecht-Kurt Weill musical The Threepenny Opera opposite Cyndi Lauper. Cumming performed alongside Dianne Wiest in Classic Stage Company's production of Anton Chekhov's The Seagull, directed by Viacheslav Dolgachev. In 2002, Cumming and then-boyfriend Nick Philippou formed the production company The Art Party. The company's first and only play was the first English production of Jean Genet's play Elle, which Cumming had adapted from a literal translation by Terri Gordon. The company closed in 2003.

In 2006, he returned to the West End playing the lead role in Bent, a play about homosexuals in Germany under the Nazis. In 2007, he took the lead role in the National Theatre of Scotland's production of The Bacchae, directed by John Tiffany, which premiered at the Edinburgh International Festival in August, transferring to the Lyric Theatre in London and then to Lincoln Center, New York, winning him the Herald Archangel award.

He collaborated again with Tiffany and the National Theatre of Scotland in 2012, playing all the roles in Macbeth. He brought this critically acclaimed production of Macbeth to New York's Lincoln Center in 2012 and to a 73-show Broadway engagement at the Ethel Barrymore Theatre in 2013. Macbeth concluded its run on Broadway on 14 July 2013.

In 2014, he returned again to Broadway to star in Roundabout Theater Company's revival production of Cabaret, directed again by Sam Mendes. Starring opposite Michelle Williams, Cabaret opened 24 April 2014 and closed 29 March 2015. The run was extended originally from its 24-week engagement. The role of Sally changed during the production, when Williams left, to include Emma Stone and Sienna Miller.

In 2020, he played in Endgame at the Old Vic, co-starring with Daniel Radcliffe.

In August 2022, he played Robert Burns in one-man dance show called Burn as part of the 75th Edinburgh international festival (EIF).

Other work

Cumming's novel, Tommy's Tale, was published in 2002. He has also written articles for magazines, notably as a contributing editor for Marie Claire, writing on the haute couture shows in Paris, as well as what it was like for him dressing as a woman for a day. He also contributed articles to Newsweek, Modern Painters, Out, Black Book and The Wall Street Journal. He has written introductions and prefaces to various books, including the works of Nancy Mitford, Andy Warhol and Christopher Isherwood, and wrote a chapter of If You Had Five Minutes with the President, a collection of 55+ essays by members or supporters of The Creative Coalition. In September 2017, Cumming and promoter Daniel Nardicio opened a bar in Manhattan's East Village called Club Cumming.
 Cumming recorded a duet of "Baby, It's Cold Outside" with Liza Minnelli to raise money for Broadway Cares/Equity Fights AIDS and 11 September Fund.
 In 2005, he released an award-winning fragrance called "Cumming" and a related line of scented bath lotion and body wash. A second fragrance was launched in 2011, named "Second (Alan) Cumming", with all proceeds going to charity.
 On 1 September 2009, Cumming released his first solo album based around his one-man show, I Bought a Blue Car Today.
 In 2012, he narrated the audiobook Macbeth: A Novel, written by A.J. Hartley and David Hewson. The novel greatly expands upon the themes established in the play.
 On 10 April 2012, he released the single "Someone Like the Edge of Firework"
 In 2012, he launched his photography career with his first exhibition Alan Cumming Snaps.
 In July 2012, Cumming presented Urban Secrets on Sky Atlantic and the Travel Channel where he uncovers hidden secrets in various urban areas including London and Brighton.
 In October 2013, Cumming appeared in the music video for "City of Angels" by Thirty Seconds to Mars.
 In 2014, Cumming was a supporter and activist for the Scottish 'Yes' campaign in the run-up to Scotland's referendum on independence in September 2014.
 In October 2014, Cumming and the Broadway cast of Cabaret collected donations for Broadway Cares/Equity Fights AIDS during the "Gypsy of the Year" fundraising season.
 In 2014, he published his autobiography, Not My Father's Son, which deals with both his experiences growing up with an abusive father and the discoveries he made about his maternal grandfather's life while filming Who Do You Think You Are?
 On 7 June 2015, Cumming co-hosted the 69th annual Tony Awards alongside Kristin Chenoweth.
 On 5 February 2016, Cumming released his second full-length album, recorded live at New York City's Café Carlyle, Alan Cumming Sings Sappy Songs: Live at the Cafe Carlyle. He toured an aptly styled, intimate, cabaret-like live stage production following his success with the Carlyle recording. In November 2016, PBS aired a filming of his show Alan Cumming Sings Sappy Songs from The Smith Center in Las Vegas.
 In June 2021, Cumming was artistic director of the Adelaide Cabaret Festival, as announced in June 2020.

Other activities 

Cumming has promoted LGBT rights, MC-ing and attending fundraisers for organisations such as the Gay & Lesbian Alliance Against Defamation (GLAAD) and the Human Rights Campaign (HRC), and taking part in an Equality Network video campaign, from New York, promoting the legalisation of same-sex marriage in Scotland. Cumming also supports several AIDS charities, including the American Foundation for AIDS Research (AMFAR) and Broadway Cares/Equity Fights AIDS, and is also a patron of NORM-UK, an English-registered charity concerned with foreskin health and matters related to circumcision; he has condemned the practice of routine infant circumcision, particularly in the United States, where it is common.

Recognition and honours 
In March 2005, Cumming received the Vito Russo Award at the 16th Annual GLAAD Media Awards for outstanding contributions toward eliminating homophobia. In July of the same year, he was presented with the HRC's Humanitarian Award in San Francisco, also for his LGBT public stance. In November 2006, Cumming received a Doctor of Arts honorary degree from the University of Abertay Dundee, and in 2015 he received a honorary degree from the Open University. He also is a patron of the Scottish Youth Theatre, Scotland's National Theatre "for and by" young people.

Cumming was appointed Officer of the Order of the British Empire (OBE) in the 2009 Birthday Honours for services to film, theatre and the arts and to activism for equal rights for the gay and lesbian community in the United States. On 27 January 2023, his 58th birthday, Cumming announced via his Instagram page that he had decided to return his OBE due to "misgivings I have being associated with the toxicity of empire".

Cumming has also been honoured for his activism and humanitarian work by organisations such as the Trevor Project and the Matthew Shepard Foundation.

Personal life
Cumming is bisexual. His relationships include an eight-year marriage to actress Hilary Lyon, a two-year relationship with actress Saffron Burrows and a six-year relationship with theatre director Nick Philippou. In 2006, Cumming stated that he "would dearly like to adopt a child", but that his life was "too hectic" for the rearing of children.

Cumming and his partner, illustrator Grant Shaffer, dated for two years before becoming civil partners at the Old Royal Naval College in Greenwich, London, on 7 January 2007. Cumming and Shaffer legally married in New York on 7 January 2012, the fifth anniversary of their London union.

On 7 November 2008, Cumming became a dual-national and was sworn in as a citizen of the United States at a ceremony in New York City.

Cumming has stated that since 2012 he has maintained a vegan lifestyle. PETA awarded him its Humanitarian Award in 2017.

He is a supporter of the Scottish National Party and Scottish independence. Cumming endorsed Senator Bernie Sanders in the 2016 US presidential election.

Cumming is an atheist.

Bibliography
 Tommy's Tale: A Novel. New York: ReganBooks, 2002. .
May the foreskin be with you : why circumcision doesn't make sense and what you can do about it.. Magnus Books, 2012. 
 Not My Father's Son: A Memoir. New York: Dey Street, an imprint of William Morrow Publishers, 2014. .
 
 The Adventures of Honey & Leon By: Alan Cumming, Illustrated by: Grant Shaffer 
 Baggage: Tales from a Fully Packed Life, a topical memoir, 2019. Scrollable preview. Iron Press.

Filmography

Awards and nominations

References

External links

 
 
 
 
 
 
 
 
 

1965 births
Living people
20th-century Scottish male actors
21st-century Scottish male actors
20th-century Scottish comedians
21st-century Scottish comedians
Alumni of the Royal Conservatoire of Scotland
American health activists
American memoirists
British male dramatists and playwrights
Bisexual male actors
Bisexual rights activists
Bisexual screenwriters
Bisexual dramatists and playwrights
Bisexual singers
Bisexual comedians
Bisexual memoirists
British expatriate male actors in the United States
Drama Desk Award winners
Genital integrity activists
Laurence Olivier Award winners
Scottish LGBT rights activists
Scottish LGBT comedians
Scottish LGBT actors
Scottish LGBT singers
Scottish LGBT screenwriters
Scottish LGBT dramatists and playwrights
Officers of the Order of the British Empire
People educated at Carnoustie High School
People from Angus, Scotland
People from Perth and Kinross
People with acquired American citizenship
Scottish atheists
Scottish emigrants to the United States
Scottish male comedians
Scottish male film actors
Scottish male musical theatre actors
Scottish male stage actors
Scottish male television actors
Scottish male video game actors
Scottish male voice actors
Scottish memoirists
Scottish nationalists
Scottish male screenwriters
Theatre World Award winners
Tony Award winners
People associated with the Open University
20th-century Scottish LGBT people
21st-century Scottish LGBT people